Lophocampa subvitreata is a moth of the family Erebidae. It was described by Rothschild in 1922. It is found in French Guiana and Guatemala.

References

 Natural History Museum Lepidoptera generic names catalog

subvitreata
Moths described in 1922